Carnoustie Golf Links is in Carnoustie, Angus, Scotland. Carnoustie has four courses – the historic Championship Course, the Burnside Course, the Buddon Links Course and a free-to-play short, five-hole course called The Nestie. Carnoustie Golf Links is one of the venues in the Open Championship rotation and has hosted golf's oldest major on eight occasions (1931, 1937, 1953, 1968, 1975, 1999, 2007, 2018), as well as the Senior Open Championship in 2010 and 2016 and the Women's British Open in 2011 and 2021.

History

Golf is recorded as having been played at Carnoustie in the early 16th century. In 1890, the 14th Earl of Dalhousie, who owned the land, sold the links to the local authority. It had no funds to acquire the property, and public fundraising was undertaken and donated to the council. The original course was of ten holes, crossing and recrossing the Barry Burn; it was designed by Allan Robertson, assisted by Old Tom Morris, and opened in 1842. The opening of the coastal railway from Dundee to Arbroath in 1838 brought an influx of golfers from as far afield as Edinburgh, anxious to tackle the ancient links. This led to a complete restructuring of the course, extended in 1867 by Old Tom Morris to the 18 holes which had meanwhile become standardized. Young Tom Morris won a major open event there that same year. Two additional courses have since been added: the Burnside Course and the shorter though equally testing Buddon Links.

Carnoustie first played host to The Open Championship in 1931, after modifications to the course by James Braid in 1926. The winner then was Tommy Armour, from Edinburgh.

Later Open winners at Carnoustie include Henry Cotton of England in 1937, Ben Hogan of the USA in 1953, Gary Player of South Africa in 1968, Tom Watson of the USA in 1975, Paul Lawrie of Scotland in 1999, Pádraig Harrington of Ireland in 2007 and Francesco Molinari of Italy in 2018. The 1975, 1999 and 2007 editions were all won in playoffs.

The Championship course was modified significantly (but kept its routing used since 1926) prior to the 1999 Open, with all bunkers being rebuilt, many bunkers both added and eliminated, many green complexes expanded and enhanced, and several new tees being built. A large hotel was also built behind the 18th green of the Championship course.

The Amateur Championship was first hosted by Carnoustie in 1947; the winner was Willie Turnesa. The world's oldest amateur event has returned three times since: 1966 (won by Bobby Cole), 1971 (won by Steve Melnyk), and 1992 (won by Stephen Dundas).

The British Ladies Amateur was first hosted by Carnoustie in 1973, and also in 2012.

The Senior Open Championship was held at Carnoustie for the first time in 2010, with Germany's Bernhard Langer winning. The Women's British Open was held here for the first time in 2011; the winner was Yani Tseng.

Carnoustie is one of the three courses hosting the Alfred Dunhill Links Championship, an autumn event on the European Tour; the others are the Old Course at St Andrews and Kingsbarns.

The Golf Channel's reality series The Big Break, in which aspiring golfers compete for exemptions on professional tours and other prizes, filmed its fourth season at Carnoustie in 2005. As that year also saw the Ryder Cup at The K Club in Ireland, that year's show was based around a US vs Europe theme, with the two teams competing for European Tour exemptions.

In North America, the course is nicknamed "Car-nasty," due to its famous difficulty, especially under adverse weather conditions. Carnoustie is considered to be the most difficult course in the Open rota, and one of the toughest courses in the world.

The 1999 Open Championship is best remembered for the collapse of French golfer Jean van de Velde, who needed only a double-bogey six on the 72nd hole to win the Open—and proceeded to score a triple-bogey seven, tying Paul Lawrie and 1997 champion Justin Leonard at 290 (+6). Lawrie won the four-hole aggregate playoff and the championship.

The Open Championship was once again contested at Carnoustie in July 2007. The eight-year absence was far shorter than the lengthy 24 years it took to return to Carnoustie, between 1975 and 1999. Harrington triumphed over García in a four-hole playoff. The 18th hole once again proved itself among the most dramatic and exciting in championship golf. Harrington had a one-shot lead over García as he approached the final hole in the fourth round, but proceeded to put not one but two shots into the Barry Burn, on his way to a double-bogey 6. García, playing in the final pairing of the day, reached the 18th with a one-shot lead over Harrington, but bogeyed the hole after missing a putt from just under ten feet away, setting up the playoff. In the four-hole playoff, which ended on the 18th, Harrington took no chances with a two-shot lead on the 18th; his bogey was enough to defeat García by one shot.

The Open Championship returned to Carnoustie in 2018, where Francesco Molinari became the first Italian major winner, and Europe's third consecutive Open champion at Carnoustie. Molinari's final round was a bogey-free 69, which saw off challenges from several players including past champions Tiger Woods and Rory McIlroy.

On 17 January 2014, Carnoustie Golf Links appointed its first-ever female chairman, Pat Sawers.

Carnoustie Golf Links won the title of World's Best Golf Course 2019 at the World Golf Awards, Abu Dhabi.

The Open Championship

This is a list of The Open Championship champions at Carnoustie Golf Links:

Note: For multiple winners of The Open Championship, superscript ordinal identifies which in their respective careers.

The Women's British Open
Winners of the Women's British Open at Carnoustie Golf Links.

The Senior Open
Winner of The Senior Open Championship at Carnoustie Golf Links.

Course

Championship Course 
Championship scorecard (as of August 2021):  

Lengths of the course for previous Opens (since 1930):
 2018 :  , par 71
 2007 :  , par 71
 1999 :  , par 71
 1975 :  , par 72
 1968 :  , par 72
 1953 :  , par 72
 1937 :  , par 72
 1931 :  , par 72
The 12th hole was played as a par-5 in 1975, and the 18th hole was played as a par-5 in previous Opens (1931−1968).

Length of the course for Women's British Open
 2011: , par 72
 2021: , par 71

Length of the course for Senior Open Championship
 2016: , par 72
 2010: , par 71

Course record

Scorecard 

{|class="wikitable" span = 50 style="font-size:85%;
|-

|style="background: Pink;" width=10|
|Birdie
|}

Burnside Course

Buddon Links Course

See also
Golf in Scotland

References

External links
 
 

Golf clubs and courses in Angus, Scotland
The Open Championship venues
1850 establishments in Scotland
Sports venues completed in 1850